The aquatics events at the 2010 Commonwealth Games took place at the SPM Swimming Pool Complex, Talkatora Gardens, Delhi from 4–13 October 2010. Events in the aquatic disciplines of swimming (long course), and diving were contested, with 46 sets of medals being competed for in total.

Training venues
 Games Village
 Yamuna Sports Complex
 MDC National Stadium Complex
 Siri Fort Sports Complex

Diving

Men

Women

Diving medal table

Participating nations

Swimming

Men

Legend
WR: World record, (EAD events: World record)
GR: Games record
*: Swam only in the heats

Women

Legend
WR: World record, (EAD events: World record)
GR: Games record

Medal table

Participating nations

Synchronised swimming

See also
List of Commonwealth Games records in swimming

References

External links
Aquatics - XIX commonwealth Games 2010 Delhi
Schedule

 
2010
Commonwealth Games
2010 Commonwealth Games events